William Barlum Thompson (March 10, 1860 – February 12, 1941) was the Mayor of Detroit from 1907 to 1908 and again from 1911 to 1912.

Biography
William Barlum Thompson was born on March 10, 1860, in Detroit, the son of Thomas and Bridget Barlum Thompson. He graduated from the public schools of the city, and in 1876 from Goldsmith's Business University, located in Detroit.

He went into the meat-market business with his uncle Thomas Barlum, became a partner with Barlum in 1880, and set off on his own in 1882. In 1887 he married Nellie Hymes; the couple had nine children: Mary (born 1888), Kathleen (1889), Irene (1891), William Grover (1892), Francis Leo (1895), Helen M. (1897), Edna L. (1899), Edith R. (1905), and Virginia M. (1909).

Politics
William Barlum Thompson was a Democrat, and served as an alderman for two terms, from 1891 to 1894, but declined to run for a third term. However, by popular demand, he ran again in 1896 and was re-elected. In 1897, he was elected city treasurer and resigned his seat as an alderman. He served as treasurer for nine years.

He was elected mayor twice, serving in 1907-1908 and again in 1911-1912.

Later life
Thompson went into partnership with his cousin John J. Barlum, forming the Cadillac Square Improvement Company. The company constructed a number of buildings around Cadillac Square, including the Barlum Tower (now Cadillac Tower), the Barlum Hotel (now New Cadillac Square Apartments), and the Lawyers Building.

William Barlum Thompson died in Detroit on February 12, 1941.

References

External links

1860 births
1941 deaths
City and town treasurers in the United States
Detroit City Council members
Mayors of Detroit
Michigan Democrats
20th-century American politicians